The University of Texas at Dallas (also referred to as UT Dallas or UTD) is a public research university in the University of Texas System. The main campus is in the heart of the Richardson, Texas, Telecom Corridor, 18 miles north of downtown Dallas.  UT Dallas people includes an Antarctic explorer, an astronaut, members of the National Academies, four Nobel laureates, a writer and folklorist, a member of India's Parliament, the founder of the world's first molecular nanotechnology company and others who have achieved prominent careers in business, government, engineering, science, medicine, the arts, and education.

Faculty

Distinguished faculty include but are not limited to the following:

Faculty Emeriti

Klaus Truemper

University presidents

Alumni
Notable alumni include:

See also

References

University of Texas at Dallas People
University of Texas at Dallas people